Acropentias aureus is a moth in the family Crambidae. It was described by Arthur Gardiner Butler in 1878. It is found in Japan, China (Heilongjiang, Zhejiang, Fujian, Hainan, Guangxi, Yunnan), Taiwan and the Russian Far East.

The length of the forewings is 7–10 mm.

References

Moths described in 1878
Pyraustinae
Moths of Asia